Bala Kuyakh (also Romanized as Bālā Kūyakh; also known as Kūyakh-e Bālā) is a village in Howmeh Rural District, in the Central District of Rasht County, Gilan Province, Iran. At the 2006 census, its population was 192, in 57 families.

References 

Populated places in Rasht County